Robert James Shaw-Hamilton (b Kilmactraney 1840 - d Killiney 1908) was Dean of Armagh from 1900 until his death.

Shaw-Hamilton was educated at Trinity College, Dublin and ordained in 1879. He began his career at Aghavea. He was Rector of Drumcar from 1873 until 1886. He was Rector  of Tynan from 1886 until his move to the Deanery.

He died on 19 July 1908; and there is a memorial to him in the north aisle at his cathedral.

References

1840 births
People from County Sligo
Alumni of Trinity College Dublin
Deans of Armagh
19th-century Irish Anglican priests
20th-century Irish Anglican priests
1908 deaths